Hypotacha nigristria is a species of moth in the family Erebidae. It is found in South Africa.

References

Endemic moths of South Africa
Moths described in 1902
Hypotacha
Moths of Africa